Mouzadar is a term referring to a person who takes tax of a mouza (revenue collection unit) during and after the British Raj in the modern-day Bangladesh and India. This term should not be confused with the gaonburha, used in addition in Assam.

Etymology and history
The name literally translates to mouza holder, from the Persian suffix ‘‘-dar’’ (دار/দার) ‘possessor’. The title was common mostly in Bengal and Assam.

External links
Online Assamese Dictionary

Titles of national or ethnic leadership
Feudalism in Bangladesh